1 Parachute Battalion (Ex Alto Vincimus) is the only full-time paratroop unit of the South African Army. It was founded on April 1st, 1961, along with the Parachute Battalion. The name of this unit was changed to Parachute Training Centre after 1998. It was the first battalion within 44 Parachute Brigade until 1999 when the brigade was downsized to 44 Parachute Regiment

The battalion has performed many active operations in battle – producing many highly decorated soldiers  in the South African Border War from 1966 to 1989. Their best known action was the controversial Battle of Cassinga in 1978.

The unit's nickname "Parabat" is a portmanteau derived from the words "Parachute Battalion".

History

Origin
In 1960 fifteen volunteers from the SADF were sent to England at RAF Abingdon, the majority to train as parachute instructors, some as parachute-packers and one SAAF pilot in the dropping of paratroopers. These men together with an older unit called 2 Mobile Watch formed the nucleus of 1 Parachute Battalion at Tempe in Bloemfontein in April 1961.

The first paratroopers were Permanent Force men, but soon the training of Citizen Force (similar to the National Guard of the United States) paratroopers commenced.

First Action
Members of 1 Parachute Battalion were the first S.A. Army soldiers to see action after World War II when, in 1966, they participated, with the South African Police, against insurgents in South West Africa.

In 1966, members of 1 Parachute Battalion participated in the first action in the war in South West Africa during a heliborne assault on an insurgent base. Thereafter, they were involved in operations in SWA/Namibia, Angola, Zambia, Mozambique and Rhodesia (now Zimbabwe) and elsewhere on an almost constant basis for over 20 years.

Organisation under the SADF
1 Parachute Bn. was organised as follows: 
Permanent Force:
 Bn H.Q., 
 H.Q. Coy and 
A and B Coy's; 
Citizen Force: 
 C Coy Cape Town, 
 D Coy Durban, 
 E Coy Pretoria and 
 F Coy Johannesburg

Development of Sister Units
Further battalions were added: 2 Para Bn in 1971 and 3 Para Bn in 1977.

Border War
In 1974 and 1975 1 Parachute Battalion operated along the Angolan border with S.W.A; along the Caprivi Strip; a platoon jumped near Luiana (September 1975), Angola to relieve a group of "Bushmen" trapped by a SWAPO force; and 3 platoons Joined Operation Savannah at Sá da Bandeira the day after the airport was taken (October 1975). The two platoons withdrew in February/March Operation Savannah during the Angolan Civil War in July 1975 when 1 string of 1 Parachute Battalion were flown to Ondangwa and travelled by Unimog to Ruancana on the northern border of SWA at Ruacana and Santa Clara in Angola to relieve two Portuguese communities trapped by the MPLA.

The Para Brigade
With the coming of 44 Parachute Brigade in April 1978, under the leadership of Brigadier M J du Plessis and Colonel Jan Breytenbach, a co-founder of the brigade. it became a powerful force. The first large airborne exercise of the Parachute Battalion Group took place in 1987 in the Northwestern Transvaal (now North West Province). With the eventual disbanding of 44 Parachute Brigade its full-time personnel were moved to Bloemfontein and incorporated into the 1 Parachute Battalion Group.

New Techniques
In 1986, the unit embarked on its first HALO/HAHO (High altitude Low Opening/High Altitude High Opening) course in Bloemfontein. This would enable the troops to drop into enemy territory from aircraft following commercial routes.

Under the SANDF
In 2001 battalion personnel formed the spearhead of the South African Protection Support Detachment deploying to Burundi.

In 2012, 1 Parachute Battalion participated in the South African military assistance to the Central African Republic operation, where the unit suffered 13 killed, with 27 injured and one missing in action in an ambush conducted by Séléka rebels. In 2014 it was announced that 1 Parachute Battalion would receive Battle Honours for this operation.

In 2013, the battalion contributed one company, under command of Major Vic Vrolik, to the FIB which fought a number of engagements in the DRC.

Training 

1 Parachute Battalion is the sole military parachute training institution in South Africa, with its parachute School being responsible for all training. The school has had only four fatalities in its existence. 1 Parachute Battalion is a full-time unit which in addition to parachute training also conducts force training to recruits inducted into the unit and other units in the South African Army.

The average age ranges in the mid-twenties. The selection and training of paratroops is rigorous to ensure a standard of combat efficiency is retained at a high level.

Recruitment
Members of 1 Parachute Battalion visit the various battalions each year early in the training cycle to look for volunteers. These must then pass a physical test at their unit prior to appearing before a selection board, which examines their character and motivation.

Initial evaluation
To give would-be members the endurance and the fitness they will need for operations in the harsh African conditions, the instructors of 44 Parachute Brigade place particular emphasis on basic physical training. Soldiers volunteering for service with the parachute forces first undergo a battery of medical tests – similar to that for flying personnel – before setting off on a  timed run. Before they can recover their breath, they tackle the second test:  run in which each man carries a comrade on his back.

The applicants are then put through various psychological and physical tests – though these are usually well within the reach of anyone with sufficient motivation and willpower.

The real ordeal will then start: for four long months, the recruits Bats will endure forced marches, physical exercises, shooting sessions and inspections – all this barracked by the screams of their eagle-eyed instructors. The South African paratroop instructors, like their British counterparts, enforce strict discipline. For example, trainees always take their grooming kit along with them on  marches and at dawn, when back at the base with aching bones, devote whatever little time is left they have to rest to 'spit and polish'.

Those who are accepted are then transferred to 1 Para, where they first complete the normal three-month basic training course, with some differences: PT three times a day, no walking in camp under any circumstances and a  run to end each day.  runs carrying tar poles; car tyres attached to the candidates by a long rope; or the dreaded  concrete slab that has to be carried everywhere the candidate goes. Some 10 to 20 percent drop out during this phase, returning to their original units. All this builds up to what is called the koeikamp ('cow camp'). It is 3 days of the ultimate challenge of physical and psychological endurance.

The would-be paratroops get a 24-hour ration pack or "rat pack" for the duration of the selection. On top of all this the candidates are out in the African bush with no showers, hot meals or beds after each gruelling day. Each year the sequence of what "tests" will be done to get the strongest out of the "wannabees" changes, so it comes as quite a surprise each year. Due to lack of sleep, hunger and extreme physical tasks many of the men give up. After all the above tests, the few remaining soldiers head back to camp where they have to complete an obstacle course called the "Elephant". Some foreign Elite soldiers claimed this to be one of the hardest bone breaking obstacle courses ever. Again, this is a timed exercise, which has to be completed several times, it is also done with full battle kit. Again the instructors are looking for any hesitant students during the high obstacles and underwater swim through a narrow tunnel. At the end of the "Elephant" several more students drop out due to injury or not completing the course in the required time. At this point the course has been completed. However, there is always the 'bad surprise" which has historically become part of the Selection Phase.

After a six-month ordeal, the selected few (about 40% of the original intake), make the 12 jumps required to obtain their wings. During this time, the chances of being disqualified are still very high. This phase is followed by some advanced individual training, during which such subjects as advanced driving, demolitions, tactics and patrolling, unarmed combat, survival skills, escape and evasion, aspects of guerrilla warfare, tracking, raiding, counterinsurgency operations, fast rope skills, ambush and anti-ambush techniques and foreign weapons and techniques are covered.

Their instructors, however, always find that something is left to be desired with the inspection which invariably follows. To harden their muscles, trainees are made to carry a telegraph pole for two days, at a rate of  daily. The detailed training programme is listed below:

Basic training – 10 weeks 
 Musketry
 Field Craft
 Drill
 Map Reading
 Buddy Aid
 Physical Training – Very important

Parachute qualification training – 5 weeks 
 Parachute Selection – 2 Weeks (8 hours Physical Training every day for 2 weeks)
 Running  and more with boots
 Battle PT with Logs, Concrete Blocks and Rifles
 Boxing, Soccer, Wrestling, Rugby with Car Tyre as ball
 Callisthenic Exercises
 Qualification Tests (60% must be attained after the 2 weeks Parachute Selection)
  with full kit in 18 minutes
 40 Shuttle Runs in 90 seconds
  fireman's lift with full kit
 Climb a 6-metre rope
 Climb over a 2-metre wall with full kit
 50 pushups without resting
 67 sit-ups in 2 minutes
 120 squat kicks without resting
 Parachute training – 3 weeks following successful parachute selection
 Ground training in hangar
 Jumping from "aapkas" (Outdoor exit trainer)
 Jumping from Dakota Aircraft
 Jumping from C130 / C160 Transall Aircraft
 Jumping includes day and night jumps, with and without kit using standard and steerable parachutes
 A total of 8 jumps must be completed before the sought after paratrooper wings are awarded
 Current Day Selection and Training for the Physical portion of the Parachute Course
 Until 1991 the physical portion of the Parachute Qualifying course was 2 weeks, but due to national service being shortened to one year, the army had a need to change and make the training more compact and fast-paced. However some of the 'older' paratroops still do physical training courses to ensure that standards do not drop.

Individual training – 8 weeks 
 Platoon Weapons
 Battle Craft
 Specialist Training (in one of the following mustering)
 Section Leaders
 Rifleman
 Mortar man
 Anti-Tank Gunner
 Machine Gunner
 Signaler
 Intelligence NCO
 Medical Orderly
 Driver
 Clerk
 Parachute Packer
 Store man

Conventional warfare training – 10 weeks 
 Advance
 Defence
 Withdrawal
 Cooperation with Armoured, Artillery, Air Force etc.
 Airborne Operations including Air Assault battle handling on sub-unit level

Counter-insurgency (COIN) training – 9 weeks 
 Bush Warfare Techniques
 Reaction Force Operations
 Specialized Air Operations
 Airborne Raids

Active operational duty 

 Once a paratroop is fully trained, he takes part in the normal operational and training activities of the unit.

Other Training 
 Specialist Parachute and other Training Courses include:
 Pathfinder Training
 Basic fast-roping/rappelling skills 
 Fast-roping/rappelling dispatchers
 Fast-roping/rappelling instructors
 Static Line dispatchers course
 Basic Parachute instructors course
 Advance static line jump course
 Basic Free Fall Course
 Free fall dispatchers course
 Free fall instructors course
 Advanced free fall course
 Advanced free fall instructors course
 Drop zone safety officers course
 Parachute Packing and checking course
 Tandem parachuting

Leadership

Insignia

Previous Dress Insignia

Battle Honours

Notes

References 

Infantry battalions of South Africa
Military units and formations in Bloemfontein
Airborne units and formations of South Africa
Military units and formations established in 1961
Military units and formations of South Africa in the Border War